Railton was a marque of British automobiles made by Fairmile Engineering Company in Cobham, Surrey between 1933 and 1940. There was an attempt to revive it by a new company between 1989 and 1994 in Alcester, Warwickshire.

History
The company was started by Noel Macklin who was looking for a new car-making venture after he sold his Invicta company in 1933. The name came from Reid Railton, the world speed record car designer, but his input was probably small although he did receive a royalty on each car sold.

1933 - Railton Terraplane
The first car was made by fitting a British body made by coachbuilder John Charles Ranalah to a 4010 cc, 100 bhp, 8-cylinder Hudson Terraplane chassis. The high-performance car has been described as a pre-war Shelby Cobra. The car was at first available as a two-door tourer. Being lighter than the original, it had for the time exceptional performance, with a 0–60 mph time of 13 seconds. A saloon-bodied version was soon added to the range, and the cars were priced at £499.

1935 - Railton 8
In 1935 the original Terraplane chassis was replaced by the one from the Hudson Eight, the engine grew to 4168 cc producing 113 bhp. A wider range of bodies from several coachbuilders were available from at least seven different vehicle coachbuilders including; Ranalah, R.E.A.L, Carbodies and Coachcraft. Two special lightweight models were made in 1935 and, with a 0–60 time of 8.8 seconds, were claimed to be the fastest production cars in the world. Altogether 1379 of the Railton 8s were made.

1937 - Railton Cobham
A smaller six-cylinder car, the 16.9 was added in 1937 using a 2723 cc Hudson 6-cylinder engine and chassis, but only 81  were made in saloon or drophead coupé form and priced at £399.

1938 - Railton 10
An even smaller Railton, the 10 hp, joined the range in 1938 built on a Standard Flying Nine chassis and with either saloon or drophead coupé bodywork was claimed to be "A famous name in miniature". 51 were made selling at £299. In 1938 Motor Sport tested a 28.8 h.p. Railton Cobham saloon, FPH 970, offered for sale at £698.

1939 - demise
Noel Macklin turned his attention to powerboats in 1939, and he sold the company to Hudson Motor Car Company of Detroit, Michigan, who transferred production to their Brentford, London works. However, the outbreak of war in 1939 stopped production.

After World War II a few cars were completed using pre-war parts, and a new model was built and shown at the 1949 London Motor Show. However, at nearly £5000 the car was incredibly expensive, and it never went into production.

1989 - Railton revival 
The name was revived by a new company called Railton Motor Company, founded in 1989 in Wixford, Warwickshire. The idea and design for a new car were by William Towns, an automobile designer and engineer, who worked for the Rootes Group, Rover, and Aston Martin. Towns met John Ransom to finance the venture.

Two convertible models, the F28 Fairmile and the F29 Claremont were announced in 1989. Both were styled by Towns and were based on Jaguar XJS running gear with new original aluminium bodywork. An objective was to have Jaguar dealerships sell and service the vehicles since the base XJS mechanical and interior were unchanged with only the "aluminium skin tacked on the top" of the cars.

By 1991, two cars were built "from scratch". The F28 Fairmile was painted burgundy and featured exposed oversized rear wheels and the F29 Claremont was done in blue with full rear fender skirts. In 1994 the rights and tooling were purchased by an entrepreneur, Graham Pierce, but the firm was officially reported as a dormant the following year and fully dissolved on 4 July 2000.

British motoring journalist Paul Walton has written about the Railton F28 Fairmile.

See also
 List of car manufacturers of the United Kingdom

References

External links

The revived Railton
The Railton owners club
Jaguar based Railtons

Defunct motor vehicle manufacturers of England
Vehicles designed by Reid Railton
Hudson Motor Car Company
Defunct companies based in Surrey